Abdesselem Lahmidi (born 1926) is a Moroccan former sports shooter. He competed in the 50 metre rifle, three positions event at the 1960 Summer Olympics.

References

External links
 

1926 births
Possibly living people
Moroccan male sport shooters
Olympic shooters of Morocco
Shooters at the 1960 Summer Olympics
Sportspeople from Rabat